Triumph Records was a UK record label set up in January 1960 by Joe Meek and William Barrington-Coupe with the financial backing of Major Wilfred Alonzo Banks. The label existed for less than a year and although most of the artistes are unknown, many of the records now sell for high prices in the record collecting world because of Meek's involvement. Even the original paper sleeves command some value.

The label had three hit singles—"Angela Jones" by Michael Cox reaching number 7 in the UK Singles Chart, "Green Jeans" by the Flee-Rekkers peaking at #23 and George Chakiris' "Heart Of A Teenage Girl" at #49—but distribution was badly organised and Meek pulled out in June 1960.  The label folded soon afterwards after a bankruptcy petition was filed on behalf of a leading musical arranger who had not been paid.  A few 45 r.p.m. records were released on Triumph that had no involvement from Meek. Many of Meek's later 1960–1961 Triumph recordings by artists including John Leyton, the Flee-Rekkers and Iain Gregory were recorded for Triumph release, but were issued on labels such as Top Rank and Pye after the label's collapse.

Discography

45rpm records by catalogue number
 RGM1000 - "Just Too Late" / "Friendship" - Peter Jay and the Blue Men
 RGM1001 - "Magic Wheel" - "Rodd-Ken The Cavaliers" / "Happy Valley" - Rodd & the Cavaliers
 RGM1002 - "Let's Go See Grandma" / "Believe Me" - Joy & Dave
 RGM1003-6 were unused
 RGM1007 - "With This Kiss" / "Don't Tell Me Not To Love You" - Yolanda
 RGM1008 - "Green Jeans" / "You Are My Sunshine" - The Flee-Rekkers - UK #23
 RGM1009 - "Hot Chick'Aroo" / "Don't Pick On Me" - Ricky Wayne
 RGM1010 - "Heart Of A Teenage Girl" / "I'm Always Chasing Rainbows" - George Chakiris - UK #49
 RGM1011 - "Angela Jones" / "Don't Want To Know" - Michael Cox - UK #7
 RGM1012 - "The Boy with the Eyes of Blue" / "I Gave Him Back His Ring" - Carol Jones
 RGM1013 - "Lover and His Lass" / "Lonesome Traveller" - Charles Blackwell
 RGM1022 - "T'aint What You Do" / "Out There" - Don Fox
 RGM1023 - "Chicken Sax" / "Snake Eyes" - Rex & the Minors
 RGM1024 - "Ricky" / "Dear Daddy" - Pat Reader
 RGM1027 - "My Charlie" / "Tell Me" - Barbara Lyon
 RGM1030 - "Tell Tommy I Miss Him" / "I'm Sending Back Your Roses" - Laura Lee

Extended play 7" records
 RGXST5000 - "I Hear A New World Part 1" - The Blue Men
 RGXST5001 - "I Hear A New World Part 2" - The Blue Men (not released, sleeves only exist)
 RGJ7002/Saga TSTP1041 - Stravinsky: Dumbarton Oaks Concerto - Haydn Orchestra

Long play 12" records
 RGXST9000 - I Hear A New World - The Blue Men (not officially released, was pressed in limited white label promo format. Also slated for issue on 5" stereo reel-to-reel tape, but only one demonstration copy has ever been seen).

See also
 :Category:British independent record labels
 List of record labels
 Triumph Records (United States)

References

External links
The Triumph Records story
45rpm records RGM1012 onwards at Vinylnet.co.uk

Record labels established in 1960
Record labels disestablished in 1961
Pop record labels
British independent record labels
Record labels based in London
Defunct record labels of the United Kingdom